Fly by Night is a children's or young adults' fantasy novel by Frances Hardinge, published on 7 October 2005 by Macmillan in the UK and on 25 April 2006 by HarperCollins in the US. Fly by Night won the Branford Boase Award in 2006, and was listed in the School Library Journal's Best Books of 2006. It was shortlisted for the 2006 Guardian Children's Fiction Prize, as was its sequel Twilight Robbery in 2011.

Hardinge's comic fantasy is set in the grotesque imaginary world of The Realm, which, as she writes in an after note, bears some similarity to early 18th century England.  As religion, the people venerate numerous small deities known as the Beloved, each sacred to a part of a day in the year.  Children must be named for the Beloved in whose time they are born, though a degree of fraud occurs to obtain a better name.  This religion has been restored following a period when a militant movement, the Bird-catchers, sought to impose their own puritanical religion, leading to a civil war in which the Bird-catchers were defeated.

The novel takes place at a time when the monarchy has been overthrown and The Realm has fractured into city states such as Mandelion, where the guilds, especially the Stationers and Locksmiths, act as power brokers.  Numerous claimants to the throne are recognized and locally supported, but more by tradition than genuine desire for restoration.  Mandelion is currently ruled by Duke Vocado Avourlace, brother of Lady Tamarind, and supporter of the claim of the Twin Princesses.  He remains unmarried since being turned down by one of them.

Synopsis 
Mosca is the daughter of Quillam Mye, an exiled writer and radical political agitator, who taught her to read but died when she was eight.  She was born in the hours sacred to Goodman Palpitattle, He Who Keeps Flies out of Jams and Butterchurns, and thus was given the name Mosca, Italian for fly.  Now twelve and living with her uncle, a miller, she yearns for the city education her father promised.  She sees her opportunity when poet and conman Eponymous Clent comes to their village, and is locked overnight in the stocks.  She steals the keys and releases Clent, accidentally burning down the mill which creates a useful distraction.  In return, Clent agrees to give her a job, and bring her to Mandelion.  She takes her fierce goose Saracen to face down the guard-dogs.

Clent tries to lose Mosca, but soon learns she is useful to him and accepts her.  Mosca and Clent have an adventurous journey to Mandelion.  On the way, they encounter Lady Tamarind's coach held up by Black Captain Blythe, a highwayman.  Clent negotiates their safe passage, finding a way to gain the gratitude of both parties.  In Mandelion, a hornet's nest of political intrigue, crime and corruption, they lodge in a marriage house, which arranges weddings for people who can't afford a church.  Clent has been contracted as an informer for the Stationers’ Guild, who want him to find out the origin of illegal anonymous leaflets which promote a radical cause.  They suspect it is some kind of provocation organised by their rivals the Locksmiths’ Guild.

Unable to find a school to take her, Mosca agrees to work as Clent's spying assistant, and becomes entangled in the politics.  Saracen is employed to take part in a beast-fight at an inn, to help Clent find out what is going on there.  They become inconveniently implicated in the murder of Partridge, a barge captain who transported Saracen to Mandelion, while also smuggling lead for rebels to make bullets.  Investigating this leads Mosca to identify the rebels, thereby uncovering a plot quite different from what anyone suspected.  The resolution of it produces a surprising regime change.

In the end, having made too many enemies, Clent has to leave Mandelion.  Mosca chooses life on the road with Clent, thus providing a lead to the sequel Twilight Robbery.

Characters 
Mosca Mye - the heroine of the story who has run away from home after burning her uncle's mill down. Her father died when she was 8. She is determined and devious.
Saracen  - Mosca's ill-tempered goose.
Eponymous Clent - a travelling wordsmith and conman of dubious repute, who has been employed to act as a spy for the Stationers.
Quillam Mye - Mosca's father, who didn't believe in the Beloved, the numerous deities of The Realm. Died when Mosca was eight, his radical books of freedom burnt.
Black Captain Blythe - a not-so-villainous highwayman.
Lady Tamarind Avourlace - sister of the Duke of Mandelion and political schemer. She keeps a crocodile in her rooms in place of a guard-dog.
Mabwick Toke - head of the Stationers' Guild in Mandelion.
Aramai Goshawk - leading agent of the Locksmiths' Guild.
Hopewood Pertellis - a young lawyer and head of an illegal school that teaches children to read.
Vocado Avourlace - current Duke of Mandelion, who is obsessed with the Twin Princesses and slowly going mad.
Linden Kohlrabi - an aide to Lady Tamarind who tries to befriend Mosca.

Factions 
Guilds - The Realm is held together by the guilds, who act as power brokers.  Every tradesman from watchmakers to playing card makers to millers belong to the guilds.  Their present policy is to pay lip-service to the monarchy while in practice preventing it from reestablishing itself.
Stationers' Guild - originally makers of stationery, after the Bird-catcher wars they were given power over all printed material. They control all printing presses and everything from handbills to news sheets to books must be approved by the Guild who affix their seal to it.  Anything without the Stationers' seal is deemed illegal and destroyed.
Locksmiths' Guild - once they only made locks and strongboxes, but now act as a mafia providing a wider range of security services.  A Locksmith will always wears gloves as the outline of a key is branded on his right palm.  The head of each cell wears chatelaine at his waist which match the brands of all the men that answer to him.  The Locksmiths have taken complete control of the neighboring city of Scurrey, and are feared to be scheming to do the same in Mandelion.
Company of Watermen - control all movement along the river.
Bird-catchers - a militant religious movement that came to power after the fall of the monarchy. They plunged the Realm into a ten-year war against those they considered heretical, which cost the lives of tens of thousands.  They were believed to have been killed, but actually they went into hiding, and eventually started a new plot against the Realm.
Radicals - a republican political movement in favor of freedom of speech and freedom from imposed religion.  Sometimes confused with the Bird-catchers, because they share some philosophies in common, though in fact bitter enemies.

References

External links 

 Frances Hardinge's homepage
 Macmillan entry for Fly by Night

2006 British novels
British fantasy novels
Children's fantasy novels
British adventure novels
Macmillan Publishers books